Białowąs or Bialowas may refer to:
 Białowąs, village in West Pomeranian Voivodeship (north-western Poland)
 Dwight Bialowas (born 1952), Canadian ice hockey player
 Frank Bialowas (born 1969), Canadian ice hockey player
 Gregor Bialowas (born 1959), Austrian weightlifter
 Ryszard Białowąs (1947–2004), Polish basketball player

See also
 
 Białous
 Bilous
 Belous

Polish-language surnames